Muhammad ibn Salih al-Uthaymin (9 March 192910 January 2001) was a Saudi Islamic scholar.

Biography 

Ibn al-Uthaymin was born on March 9, 1929, in the City of Unayzah, Qaseem Region of Saudi Arabia. He is said to have memorized the Quran at his early age and pursued an education in Hadith, Tafsir, theology, Arabic Language and other Islamic studies, later graduating from the College of Sharia in Riyadh. He went on to become a member of the Saudi Commission of Senior Islamic Scholars, a professor at the College of Shari'a at Imam Mohammad bin Saud Islamic University in Qassim and a member of its Academic Council and treatises dealing with different aspects of the Islamic doctrine. His most important books are his 15-volume book on fiqh and 10-volume book on the interpretation of the Holy Qur'an. He also used to teach at the Holy mosque in Mecca during Ramadan.

Education 
After completing his memorization of the Qur'an and foundational studies, he began his full-time religious studies under Sheikh Muhammad ibn 'Abd al-'Aziz al-Mutawwa' and Sheikh Ali al-Salihi in Unayzah. These were the two teachers that sheikh 'Abd al-Rahman al-Sa'di had appointed to instruct beginning students. After one year of studying under those two teachers, al-Uthaymeen began studying under sheikh 'Abd al-Rahman al-Sa'di in 1945 and continued to be his student until al-Sa'di's death.
The year 1952, al-Salihi advised al-Uthaymeen to enroll in the newly opened Ma'had al-'Ilmi in Riyadh, which he did after seeking permission from al-Sa'di. While there, he studied under Sheikh Muhammad al-Ameen al-Shinqiti, Sheikh 'Abd al-'Aziz bin Baz, and sheikh 'Abd al-Razzaq 'Afeefi, among others. He studied there for two years before returning to Unayzah, where began teaching and continued his studies under al-Sa'di.

The Four Levels of Spiritual Response to a Calamity 
Uthaymeen's theory on the four levels of spiritual response to a calamity is outlined below. This theory could be contrasted with the Kübler-Ross model of the five stages of grief.
 Level One: Discontentment
 Level Two: Patience
 Level Three: Acceptance
 Level Four: Gratitude

Publications
 The Beautiful Names and Attributes of Allah: The Beautiful Names and Attributes of Allah.
 The Creed of the Ahlus-Sunnah Wal Jama'ah, Translated by Abu Nasir Ibrahim Abdur-Rauf.
 How to Perform the Rituals of Hajj, Umrah and Visiting the Prophet’s Masjid.
 Guidance For Fasting Muslims.
 Fatawa Arkan-ul-Islam.
 Explanation of Summary of Hamaweyyah Creed.
 What You Must Believe about Your Creator.
 Rights and Duties in Islam.
 A Study on Ablution, Bathing, Dry Ablution (Tayammum) and Prayer.
 How Do We Believe in the Last Day?

Death 
The Shaykh died on Wednesday 15 Shawwaal 1421 A.H. / 10 January 2001 C.E. at the age of 71.

References

External links

 
 
 Biodata at MuslimScholars.info

1929 births
2001 deaths
20th-century Saudi Arabian people
Saudi Arabian Sunni Muslim scholars of Islam
Saudi Arabian imams
20th-century imams
Critics of Shia Islam
Saudi Arabian Salafis
Salafi Quietists
People from Unaizah
Sunni fiqh scholars
Critics of atheism
Critics of Christianity